Felipe González Márquez (born 5 March 1942) is a Spanish lawyer, professor, and politician, who was the Secretary-General of the Spanish Socialist Workers' Party (PSOE) from 1974 to 1997, and the 3rd Prime Minister of Spain since the restoration of democracy, from 1982 to 1996. He remains the longest-serving Prime Minister of Spain to be freely elected.

González joined the PSOE in 1964, when it was banned under the Francoist regime. He obtained a law degree from the University of Seville in 1965. In 1974, the PSOE elected González as its Secretary-General after a split in its 26th Congress. After Franco's death and the beginning of the Spanish transition to democracy, González obtained a seat in the Congress of Deputies after he led the PSOE candidacy in the 1977 general election, but lost to Adolfo Suárez.

After the PSOE victory in the 1982 general election, González formed his first majority government, backed by 202 out of the 350 deputies at the Congress of Deputies, and led the Government of Spain for thirteen and a half years after three additional victories in the 1986, 1989 and 1993 general elections. In 1996, González lost the election to José María Aznar and the People's Party and was elected to the Congress of Deputies for the last time in the 2000 general election, from Seville.

Early life
González was born in Bellavista, Seville, the son of a small dairy farmer. He has a sister called Lola González Márquez, married to Francisco Germán Palomino Romera, by whom she has two sons, Felipe and Germán Palomino González. He studied law at Seville University and started his career as attorney specialising in labor law. While at the University he met members of the clandestine socialist trade union Unión General de Trabajadores (UGT). He also contacted members of the PSOE and started taking part in the party's clandestine activity, necessary under the dictatorship of Franco. During that time he adopted the alias Isidoro and moved to Madrid. He was elected Secretary General of the Party at the Suresnes Congress, in France.

By the time of Franco's death, González had become the most prominent figure among the left-wing of the democratic opposition to the regime, and played a critical role, along with then serving prime minister Adolfo Suárez, in the Spanish transition to democracy. During the Suárez government, General and vice president Manuel Gutiérrez Mellado asked González not to raise the debate of the Civil War and Franquist repression until the death of those of his generation.

In the first democratic general election after Franco's death, held in 1977, the PSOE became the second most-voted for party, and this served González to appear as a young, active and promising leader. However, he did not win the 1979 election and had to wait for 1982 and the dissolution of the Union of the Democratic Centre party to come into office.

Prime Minister of Spain

In the 1982 general election held on 28 October 1982, the PSOE gained 48.3% of the vote and 202 deputies (out of 350). On 2 December González became President of the Government of Spain, with Alfonso Guerra as his deputy. He was the first socialist to hold the post since the Spanish Civil War, and his government was the first since then in which none of its members had served under Francoism.

With a large majority in the Congress of Deputies, popularly known as "the roller" (el rodillo in Spanish), González' election was met with tremendous expectation of change amongst Spaniards. Under his government universal and free education provision was extended from age 14 to age 16, university education was reformed and expanded, the social security system was extended and a partial legalisation of abortion became law for the first time, despite opposition from the Roman Catholic Church. González pushed for reforms and a restructuring of the economy.

On 23 February 1983, the Government passed a law nationalising Rumasa, a private business that included merchant banking interests, on the grounds that it was at the point of bankruptcy and the government needed to protect the savings of depositors and the jobs of its 60,000 employees, a decision that aroused considerable criticism and a judicial conflict over the law that was only resolved, in favour of the government, in December 1986.

In the 1986 general election held on 22 June 1986, the PSOE gained 44.1% of the vote and 184 deputies in Parliament. González was elected prime minister for the second time. During this second term, Spain joined the European Economic Community (EEC) in 1986. González supported Spain remaining in NATO that same year in a referendum reversing his and the party's earlier anti-NATO position.

On 29 October 1989, he won the 1989 general election with 39.6% of the vote and 175 seats, his third successive mandate.

On 6 June 1993, González won the 1993 general election with 38.8% of the vote and 159 deputies. His fourth victory was marred by the fact he was forced to form a pact with nationalist political parties from Catalonia and Basque country in order to form a new government.

Towards the end of 1995 there was a debate about whether González should lead the PSOE in the forthcoming general elections. The People's Party intensified its campaign to associate his period in office with a poor economic situation (although unemployment had begun to decline and the economic reforms of the previous decade initiated a lasting period of economic growth) and with accusations of corruption and state terrorism scandals, including allegations of waging a dirty war against the terrorist group ETA by means of the GAL. There was speculation in the press about Javier Solana as a possible replacement, but Solana was appointed Secretary General of NATO in December 1995.

In June 2020, the CIA declassified information confirming that Felipe González had authorised the creation of the GAL.

Left with no other suitable candidate, the party was again led by González and in the 1996 general election held on 3 March 1996, they gained 37.4% of the vote and 141 deputies. They lost the election to the People's Party whose leader José María Aznar replaced González as prime minister ("presidente" in Spanish, but not to be confused with the English use of the term) on 4 or 5 May 1996.

Reforms had also a deep impact on the Spanish economy, such as the extension of a network of highways, airports and the creation of new infrastructures, including the high speed train. Gonzalez-led cabinets were the first to implement a national, comprehensive infrastructure program that included not only public works but theatres, museums, secondary schools. In addition, a comprehensive welfare state was established, while improvements were made to social programmes such as pensions and unemployment benefits. A 40-hour workweek was introduced, while entitlement to paid holidays was extended to up to 30 days per year. Pension funds were also established, together with provision for social tourism. In addition, the school-leaving age was raised from 14 to 16, while the number of educational grants was multiplied by eight.

Unemployment protection was expanded and a national education system for children under the age of six was established. Cash benefits in social housing, Universal healthcare and education were introduced, along with earnings-based benefits for widowhood, sickness, disability and retirement. A Ministry of Social Affairs was also set up, allowing for social services to be decentralised in the early Nineties and to be available to all citizens, rather than only to those with social security.

The pension system was extended to needy people, universal public schooling was expanded from all children under the age of 16, and new universities were established. Healthcare was reformed, creating the National Health Service and the development of primary care medicine based on "health centres" where integral primary care for adults, pregnant women and paediatric patients was provided. When he left office, Spain had the best prepared young generation in history and women had stated coping leadership roles as never before. State run Television Española reached a high level of quality under the direction of Pilar Miró. Private television channels were also permitted in 1990, ending the state monopoly.

Felipe González also secured Spain's entry into the EEC, which the country joined in 1986 and consolidated democratic government. Together with François Mitterrand and Helmut Kohl, he gave an injection of new life to Europe's public face. He was the sole support of Kohl's drive to a united Germany, counteracting British and French hostility. He also started diplomatic relations with Israel, which had never been established by Franco because of Antisemitism. Due to his prestige, Spain also housed the Madrid Conference of 1991 peace talks between Palestinians and Israelis; these were chaired by President George H. W. Bush of the United States and Soviet President Mikhail Gorbachev. The bilateral Israeli–Palestinian negotiations eventually led to the exchange of letters and the subsequent signing of the Oslo I Accord, on the lawn of the White House on 13 September 1993. The negotiations that emanated from the Madrid conference, led to a Israel–Jordan peace treaty in 1994. The Israeli–Syrian negotiations included series of follow-on meetings, which according to some reports, came quite close, but failed to result in a peace treaty.

In the fight against terrorism, an intense police campaign secured several victories that left the terrorist organisation ETA severely debilitated. In his earlier years ETA killings totalled dozens per year (the 1987 Hipercor bombing attack in Barcelona alone killed more than 10 people), while in his latter years ETA killed far fewer. During his time as Prime Minister a group called GAL was active as a gangster-style force targeting etarras (ETA members). Several innocent people were killed and the subsequent investigations ended with some police officers and the Minister of Internal Affairs, José Barrionuevo, condemned to jail. The Constitutional Court later ratified the sentence. Among successful operations were the capture of the ETA central arsenal and archives in Sokoa (France) and the capture of the organisation's ruling body in 1992.

However, in the final years of his mandate several cases of corruption, the most notable of which were the scandals involving Civil Guard Director Roldán, further eroded popular support for the PSOE. Nonetheless González and most of his ministers generally managed to leave office with their reputation intact although there had been some singularly unfortunate choices made in the case of some of the lower ranking public servants, according to María Antonia Iglesias (La memoria recuperada. Lo que nunca han contado Felipe González y los dirigentes socialistas, 2003); this author is very close, though, to the PSOE official line, as she served as head of the public TV broadcaster Televisión Española after appointment to the post by one of Gonzalez' cabinets.

After the premiership
González ended his fourth term on 4 May 1996. Since September 1996 he has headed the Madrid-based Global Progress Foundation (FPG). At the beginning of the 34th PSOE National Congress on 20 June 1997 he surprisingly resigned as leader of the party.  He also resigned from the federal executive committee, though retaining his seat in the Congress. With no clear successor he continued to exert an enormous influence over the party.  He was only replaced at the 35th party Congress in July 2000 when José Luis Rodríguez Zapatero became the leader.

In 1996, González was the head of the OSCE delegation which was sent to Federal Republic of Yugoslavia as a mediator in the dialogue between Serbian government and the opposition, following the mass protests which have started over the alleged electoral fraud at the 1996 Serbian local elections.

In 1997 he was considered a leading candidate to take over the position of President of the European Commission after Jacques Santer. The position ultimately went to Italy's Romano Prodi. 
In 1999 González was put in charge of the party's Global Progress Commission in response to globalisation. The commission's report formed the basis of the closing declaration of the 21st Socialist International Congress on 8–9 November 1999.

He stood down as a deputy in the Spanish Parliament in March 2004.

On 27 July 2007 the Spanish Government appointed him plenipotentiary and extraordinary ambassador for the bicentenary celebrations in commemoration of the independence of Latin America. The celebrations will begin in September 2010 in Mexico.

At a summit held in Brussels on 14 December 2007, heads of state and government of European Union member states appointed González chairman of a think tank on the future of Europe. The group, consisting of up to nine prestigious personalities commissioned to drawing up a report, by June 2010, on the challenges facing the European Union from 2020 to 2030, will also look at how to achieve a closer understanding between citizens and the Union.

In December 2014, Colombian President Juan Manuel Santos granted González Colombian nationality.

From 2010 to 2015, González was appointed independent director in Gas Natural-Fenosa, one of the leading energy companies in Spain, being one of the best known high-profile cases of revolving doors in Spanish politics.

Since 2015 he has taken an active role in criticizing the emerging party Podemos, which he considers a populist threat, and have actively lobbied the PSOE against approaching Podemos for any possible government coalition. González supported PSOE candidate Pedro Sánchez in the 2015 and 2016 general elections, but in the aftermath Sánchez announced talks with Podemos and Catalan separatist parties. González then supported Susana Diaz faction in a bitter internal struggle which ended with PSOE facilitating the investiture of the conservative government and the dismissal of Pedro Sánchez.

In 2015 González traveled to Venezuela to support Leopoldo López and other imprisoned opposition leaders. His involvement came at the same time mainstream media and political parties were accusing emerging Podemos of having links with the Venezuelan government.

González is a member of the Club of Madrid, an independent non-profit organisation composed of 81 democratic former Presidents and Prime Ministers from 57 different countries.

In 2015, González was awarded the Distinguished Leadership Award for Public Service in the Americas Award by the Inter-American Dialogue for his tireless, effective, and ongoing public service and commitment to democracy in Latin America.

Personal life
González married María del Carmen Julia Romero y López in Seville on 16 July 1969 and has three children: Pablo González Romero, David González Romero and María González Romero (lawyer). He divorced Carmen Romero in 2008. In 2012 he married Mar García Vaquero.

One of his hobbies is tending bonsai trees. During his tenure at Moncloa, he received and cultivated several of them, mostly Mediterranean species, that he later donated to the Royal Botanic Garden of Madrid.

His wife Mar García Vaquero is named in the Panama Papers scandal in 2016.

Published works
  (co-authorship with Víctor Márquez Reviriego, 1982).
  (1997).
  (co-authorship with Juan Luis Cebrián, 2001).
  (2003).
  (2011).

See also
 History of Spain
 Politics of Spain

References

Further reading
 Wilsford, David, ed. Political leaders of contemporary Western Europe: a biographical dictionary (Greenwood, 1995) pp 176–82

External links

EU Council CV
Analysis of his rule

|-

|-

|-

1942 births
Collars of the Order of Isabella the Catholic
Grand Crosses of the Order of Christ (Portugal)
Living people
Members of the constituent Congress of Deputies (Spain)
Members of the 1st Congress of Deputies (Spain)
Members of the 2nd Congress of Deputies (Spain)
Members of the 3rd Congress of Deputies (Spain)
Members of the 4th Congress of Deputies (Spain)
Members of the 5th Congress of Deputies (Spain)
Members of the 6th Congress of Deputies (Spain)
Members of the 7th Congress of Deputies (Spain)
Lawyers from Seville
Prime Ministers of Spain
20th-century Spanish lawyers
Spanish Socialist Workers' Party politicians
University of Seville alumni